The Bangsamoro Cabinet is part of the local government of the Bangsamoro Autonomous Region in Muslim Mindanao of the Philippines. It is currently being led by Chief Minister Murad Ebrahim. Ebrahim made his first set of appointments to the cabinet in February 2019 during the official turnover of the former Autonomous Region in Muslim Mindanao to the succeeding Bangsamoro regional government.

As per the Bangsamoro Organic Law, there shall be at least one female member of the Cabinet.

The interim cabinet was tasked in drafting the eight government codes of Bangsamoro.

Cabinet officials

Ministers of Bangsamoro

Other officials

Notes

References

2019 establishments in the Philippines